Nicholas Field (born 5 August 1948) was a British actor of the 1970s and early 1980s. He was probably best known for his role as the doctor in What's Up Nurse! (1977). He also appeared in Lady Caroline Lamb (1973), The Adventures of Sherlock Holmes (1984), and the TV mini-series The Fortunes of Nigel (1974). In 1975 he made an appearance in the "Tonight and Every Night" episode of Z-Cars.

References

External links

British male actors
British male television actors
1948 births
Living people